Langguth is a surname, and may refer to:

 A. J. Langguth (1933–2014), American author, journalist and educator
 Gerd Langguth (born 1946), German professor of political science
 David Langguth (born 1973), German descent, Canadian professional drummer sponsored by German Drum Manufacturer Sonor, Sabian Cymbols, and Vic Firth Sticks.
 Heike Langguth (born 1979), German Muay Thai champion
 Franz Wilhelm Langguth Erben, a German winery